Kiot or KIOT may refer to:

KIOT (102.5 FM, "Coyote 102.5"), an American radio station licensed to Los Lunas, New Mexico
Kiot, another name for an icon case (Russian: киот, Ukrainian: кіот, from Greek: κῑβωτός box, ark), a decorated case (usually foldable) or glass shelf for displaying religious icons
Krishna Institute of Technology, a private engineering institute affiliated to Uttar Pradesh Technical University, Lucknow
Knowledge Institute of Technology, an engineering school located at Kakapalayam, Salem, Tamil Nadu in India
Kiot, a 2005 collection of poems by Charles Potts

See also
Kyot